Horticultural Hall may refer to:

Horticultural Hall (Boston), built in 1901 as a headquarters for the Massachusetts Horticultural Society
Horticultural Hall, Boston (1845), predecessor of the above, built 1845
Horticultural Hall, Boston (1865), predecessor of the above, built 1865
Horticultural Hall (Lake Geneva, Wisconsin), conference center built in 1911 
Horticultural Hall (Philadelphia), built in 1876 for the Centennial Exposition, demolished in 1954. Today the site of Fairmount Park Horticulture Center
Royal Horticultural Society Old Hall, London, built in 1904 as an exhibition hall for the Royal Horticultural Society, now known as Lindley Hall, London
Royal Horticultural Society New Hall, London, built in 1925–8 as an exhibition hall for the Royal Horticultural Society but no longer owned by them, now known as Lawrence Hall, London
Horticultural Hall, Melbourne, built in 1873 and now known as Horti Hall
Horticultural Hall (West Chester, Pennsylvania), historic Opera Hall designed by Thomas U. Walter, current home of Chester County Historical Society

Architectural disambiguation pages